Nuaon, also spelled Noawan or Noan, is a village and corresponding community development block in Kaimur district of Bihar, India. As of 2011, its population was 5,292, in 798 households, while the overall block population was 106,530, in 15,263 households.

Demographics 
The 2011 Census of India reported that Nuaon block's sex ratio was 905 females to every 1000 males, which was the lowest among Kaimur district's CD blocks (the district average was 920). The sex ratio in the 0-6 age group was somewhat higher, at 945, which was slightly higher than the district average of 943. Members of scheduled castes made up 19.75% of the block's population, and members of scheduled tribes made up 0.48%. The literacy rate in Nuaon block was 70.55% (80.61% among males and 59.33% among females).

Most of Nuaon block's workfoce was employed in agriculture in 2011, with 27.74% of workers being cultivators who owned or leased their own land and another 48.07% being agricultural labourers who worked someone else's land for money. 5.10% were counted as household industry workers, and the remaining 19.09% were other workers. The workforce of Nuaon block that year was mostly male, consisting of 25,176 males and 9,795 females.

Villages 
Nuaon block contains the following 92 villages:

References 

Villages in Kaimur district